Sacoglottis gabonensis, commonly known as bitterbark tree or cherry mahogany is a medium to large sized evergreen tree within the Humiriaceae family. It is the only species within the genus, Sacoglottis that is native to tropical Africa, another, guianensis Benth. being native to Amazonia. It occurs in rainforests or on sandy soils of Senegal eastwards to Angola in central Africa. It is trade locally and known in some countries under the name, Ozouga.

Description 
Fruit is an ellipsoid drupe, greenish to yellow when ripe, 1-5 seeded.

Chemistry 
The chemical compound, Bergenin has been isolated from the stem bark of Sacoglottis gabonensis.

Uses 
Stem bark extracts is used as a palm wine additive for the preservation and potency of the alcoholic drink, while fruits of the species are favored by the African bush elephants at the Lope National Park.Some monkeys are also adapted to eat their hard seeds. Its wood is used in local marine related works such as canoe and boat making and bridge construction, it is also a good source of firewood.

References 

Flora of West Tropical Africa
Humiriaceae